Skin is the seventh album by singer-songwriter Melissa Etheridge, released in 2001. The album explores the pain, confusion, grief, and recovery Etheridge went through following her split from Julie Cypher, her companion of 12 years.  "Heal Me" features background vocals by Laura Dern and Meg Ryan.  Etheridge plays almost all the instruments and penned all the songs. Skin peaked at number nine on the Billboard 200.

Track listing

There is one known outtake titled 'Whispers in the Heart' 'My Heart' or 'Heart Whispers'

Personnel
Melissa Etheridge – guitar, harmonica, mandolin, keyboards, vocals, background vocals
Kenny Aronoff – drums
Mark Browne – bass guitar
David Cole – keyboards, programming
Abe Laboriel Jr. – programming
Meg Ryan – background vocals on "Heal Me"
Laura Dern – background vocals on "Heal Me"
Gota Yashiki – programming

Production
Producers: Melissa Etheridge, David N. Cole
Engineer: David N. Cole
Assistant engineers: Steve Genewick, Charles Paakkari
Mixing: David N. Cole, Chris Lord-Alge, Sylvia Massy, Matt Silva
Mastering: Ted Jensen
Drum programming: David N. Cole
Production coordination: Steven Girmant
Assistants: Charles Paakkari, Matt Silva
Art direction: Rick Patrick
Photography: Dan Winters

Charts

Singles – Billboard (North America)

References

External links

Melissa Etheridge albums
2001 albums
Island Records albums
Albums produced by David N. Cole